Sketch is the second extended play by South Korean singer Hyomin. It was released on March 17, 2016, by MBK Entertainment.

Release background 
In January 2016, Hyomin's agency, MBK Entertainment revealed that Hyomin was actively preparing to return to the music scene, and was expected to release a solo album in March after a year and nine months. The music video was previously shot for artists under YG Entertainment. The video was directed by Lee Ki-bo . On February 19, Hyomin posted a photo with JeA through Instagram, saying that JeA is the singing teacher of this album. Hyomin revealed the name and concept photo of the new album through SNS on February 25 and confirmed the name of the new song  "Sketch"  . MBK Entertainment released the preview of the new album "Sketch" on March 9, with the song "Still" in the album as the preview melody.

Hyomin released first single "Still" on March 14.  The album was released on March 17 with double title tracks "Sketch" and "Gold" along with two versions of the music video for "Sketch". Hyomin made her first comeback at M Countdown  on March 17, promoting both title tracks.

On March 18, Hyomin held her first release showcase for the album at Shinhan Card Fan square in Seoul.

On March 28, due to popular demand, Hyomin released a "KIHNO" version of her album, The 'KIHNO' album runs on smartphones as a new music platform.

Track listing

Controversy 
On March 1, 2016, MBK Entertainment released a promotional photo of the album teaser. Compared with the previously announced behind-the-scenes photos, it was found that the promotional photo originally taken with clothes was turned into a half-naked photo after it was released, which caused anger to fans. After the comparison, it was found that Hyomin was wearing black underwear when she originally took the promotional photo, and the published promotional photo had obvious traces of editing on Hyomin's arm.

Commercial performance 
The album was a commercial success peaking at 3 on the Weekly Gaon album chart and at 8 on the monthly chart beoming Hyomin's highest peaks the charts. By the end of April, Sketch (Album) sold over 13,000 physical copies becoming Hyomin's best selling album.

Charts

Sales

Listicles

Release history

References

2016 EPs
K-pop EPs
Interpark Music EPs